P. polymorpha may refer to:

 Pareledone polymorpha, a cephalopod mollusc
 Parmelia polymorpha, a strap lichen
 Pecopteris polymorpha, a prehistoric plant
 Peperomia polymorpha, a radiator plant
 Persicaria polymorpha, a buckwheat native to Russia
 Peyssonnelia polymorpha, a red alga
 Pheidole polymorpha, a fungus-growing ant
 Pinanga polymorpha, a palm tree
 Plecoptera polymorpha, an owlet moth
 Plumatella polymorpha, a freshwater bryozoan
 Polymixis polymorpha, an owlet moth
 Potentilla polymorpha, a herbaceous plant
 Preussia polymorpha, a saprobic fungus
 Pseudopalaina polymorpha, a land snail
 Psychotria polymorpha, an understorey tree